Camilo Cienfuegos Gorriarán (6 February 1932 – 28 October 1959) was a Cuban revolutionary born in Havana. Along with Che Guevara, Fidel Castro, Juan Almeida Bosque, and Raúl Castro, he was a member of the 1956 Granma expedition, which launched Fidel Castro's armed insurgency against the government of Cuban dictator Fulgencio Batista. He became one of Castro's top guerrilla commanders, known as the "Hero of Yaguajay" after winning a key battle of the Cuban Revolution. His signature weapons were a M1921AC Thompson and a modified M2 carbine.

He was appointed head of Cuba's armed forces shortly after the victory of Castro's rebel army in 1959. He was presumed dead when a small plane he was traveling in disappeared during a night flight from Camagüey to Havana later that year. Many have speculated and conspiracies have arisen concerning his mysterious disappearance. Cienfuegos, whose name translates in English to "a hundred fires," is revered in Cuba as a hero of the Revolution, with monuments, memorials, and an annual celebration in his honor.

Early life
Camilo Cienfuegos, born on 6 February 1932 in Havana's Lawton district, grew up in a working-class family that had emigrated from Spain prior to the civil war of 1936–39. His father, a tailor who worked a small shop in Havana, had left-wing political principles.

Artistically inclined since early youth, Camilo enrolled in the Escuela Nacional de Bellas Artes "San Alejandro" in 1950, but left his studies soon after due to financial problems. During this period he started working as a tailor apprentice in "El Arte," a fashion store in downtown Havana.

Around 1948 he became involved in politics, initially taking part in popular protests against rising bus-fares. In April 1953, Cienfuegos and a friend traveled to the U.S. on 29-day visitors' visas in search of work. They spent several months working low-paying jobs in New York City, Chicago, and San Francisco until immigration officials took them into custody and returned them to Cuba via Mexico. While in New York, Cienfuegos became involved with a Cuban political exile group and wrote a few articles for its newspaper, La Voz de Cuba ("The Voice of Cuba").

In personality, writes one historian, Cienfuegos "exemplified the quintessential native, male, urban Cuban with his sense of humor, great interest in dancing and baseball, good looks, love of women, and overall joie de vivre". Rufo López-Fresquet, who served as Minister of Finance for the first fourteen months of the revolutionary government, described him as "a happy-go-lucky, adventuresome sort".

Political awakening
In 1954, Cienfuegos became an active member of the underground student movement against autocratic President Fulgencio Batista. On 5 December 1955, the eve of the anniversary of the death of 19th-century Cuban independence hero Antonio Maceo, soldiers opened fire on Cienfuegos and other students who were returning to their Havana university after placing a wreath on Maceo's monument. Cienfuegos later described this as the moment in which he pledged himself to freeing Cuba from the Batista dictatorship. Jobless and harassed by police, he left Cuba in March 1956 and again traveled to the US, where he worked in Miami and San Francisco for a few weeks before heading to Mexico, intent on joining a small Cuban rebel army being organized by Fidel Castro. On arriving in Mexico, Cienfuegos befriended Castro and began training with the rebels. He was one of the 82 revolutionaries who set sail for Cuba aboard the Granma in November 1956.

Cienfuegos was not as "politically sophisticated" as the Castros or Guevara, and has been described as "ideologically an unknown quantity". He was not particularly dogmatic. On the question of tactics, he departed from many others in the revolutionary movement in rejecting violence and revenge. In October 1958, when a Cuban Masonic organization expressed concern that someone captured by the rebels might be tortured and killed, he replied:

Guerrilla activities

The Granma arrived in Cuba on 2 December. After three days of swamps and mangroves, the rebels were surprised by Batista's forces at Alegría de Pío. The surviving rebels escaped in small dispersed groups and wandered for weeks in the Sierra Maestra mountains. Cienfuegos was one of the twelve who survived to rejoin Castro a month later.

In 1957, he became one of the leaders of the revolutionary forces, appointed to the rank of Comandante. In 1958, after the collapse of the  government's Operation Verano, Cienfuegos was put in command of one of three columns which headed west out of the mountains with the intention of capturing the provincial capital city of Santa Clara. Che Guevara was in command of another column and Jaime Vega was in command of the third. Vega's column was ambushed and defeated by Batista's forces.

Cienfuegos' and Guevara's columns reached the central provinces, where they combined their efforts with  other groups. Cienfuegos' column attacked an army outpost at Yaguajay and, after a tough fight, forced the garrison to surrender on 30 December 1958. This earned him the nickname "The Hero of Yaguajay." Cienfuegos then advanced against Santa Clara in conjunction with Guevara's forces, and the other non-Castro forces from the Escambray front. Together, the two columns captured Santa Clara on 31 December. Most of the defenders surrendered without firing their weapons. Batista fled Cuba the next day, leaving the guerrilla fighters victorious. At a rally on 8 January 1959, Castro interrupted his speech to ask Cienfuegos "¿Voy bien, Camilo?" ("Am I doing all right, Camilo?") His response "Vas bien, Fidel" ("You're doing fine, Fidel") was taken up by the crowd and became a slogan of the revolution.

For the next several months, Cienfuegos served as Chief of Staff of the Cuban Army, helped defeat several anti-Castro uprisings, and played a role in implementing the regime's agrarian reforms.

Death

Huber Matos, military chief of Camagüey province, had complained to Fidel Castro that communists were being allowed to occupy leadership positions in the revolutionary government and the army. Finding Castro unwilling to discuss his concerns, Matos, on 19 October, sent a letter to Castro resigning his command. Castro the next day denounced Matos. He sent troops to occupy key positions in  Camagüey, expecting incorrectly that Matos would lead a revolt, and named Cienfuegos to take command and to arrest Matos. Matos pleaded with Cienfuegos to listen to his concerns, but Cienfuegos assured him it could be worked out and arrested Matos on 21 October.

On the late evening of 28 October 1959, Cienfuegos' Cessna 310 ('FAR-53') disappeared over the Straits of Florida during a night flight, returning from Camagüey to Havana. An immediate search lasted several days, but the plane was not found. By mid-November, the search was called off and Cienfuegos was presumed lost at sea. He quickly became a hero and martyr for the Cuban revolution. Cienfuegos' disappearance remains unexplained. There is some debate in regard to Cienfuegos' death, although the Cuban government's sanctioned historians do not believe that there was any foul play by the government. There is speculation that Fidel was responsible, which Matos believed is the case. Despite the fact of Cienfuegos' evidently exceptional loyalty to Castro, he hesitantly supported the arrest of his friend Matos only days earlier. Che Guevara, who was close to Cienfuegos and named his son Camilo in his honor, dismissed the notion of Castro's involvement. Others offer the possibility that a Cuban air force fighter plane mistook Cienfuegos' plane for a hostile intruder and shot it down. In the words of U.S. Ambassador Philip Bonsal, Cienfuegos enjoyed Havana's nightlife and he "may have had a penchant for friendships and associations deemed undesirable by some of his more austere revolutionary comrades". There has also been speculation that Cienfuegos faked his death and fled to the US, as some speculate it may have been to Ybor City in Tampa.

Remembrance

Che Guevara stated about Cienfuegos the following:

Cuba has named a socialist award, the Order of Cienfuegos, after him. On 28 October, school children throughout Cuba throw flowers into the sea or a river to honor Camilo Cienfuegos, repeating the spontaneous tribute of the Cubans who tossed flowers into the ocean when they heard his plane had been lost over the Cuba Florida Strait. Camilo is also remembered on the 20 Cuban peso bill and the 20 Cuban convertible peso bill. He was also pictured on the 40-cent coins, now discontinued.

The University of Matanzas bears the name "Camilo Cienfuegos". A series of military high schools for students aged 11 to 17 are named the Camilo Cienfuegos Schools. Its graduates receive priority admission to cadet schools. The neighborhood known until 1950 as "Central Hershey," in the municipality of Santa Cruz del Norte, Havana, was renamed Central Camilo Cienfuegos.

A museum dedicated to Cienfuegos –the Monumento y MuseoCamilo Cienfuegos– was built after his death in Yaguajay, at the site of the barracks of the Batista's forces during the 1958 battle. The museum includes a diorama of the battle, as well as material relating to Cienfuegos' life before, during, and after the revolution. A large statue of him stands in front of the museum.

In the 2008 film Che, the character of Cienfuegos was "played with great verve" by Santiago Cabrera.

On 28 October 2009, to note the 50th anniversary of his death, a 100-ton steel outline of Cienfuegos' face and the words Vas bien, Fidel was added to the side of the Ministry of Informatics and Communications building on the Plaza de la Revolución.

See also
List of people who disappeared mysteriously at sea

References

Further reading

External links

Bio of Cienfuegos
"Who was Camilo Cienfuegos?" at History of Cuba
Camilo, la Estrella Cercana , a podcast about Camilo at Radio Rebelde 

1932 births
1950s missing person cases
1959 deaths
Cuban communists
Cuban guerrillas
Cuban people of Asturian descent
Cuban revolutionaries
Cuban soldiers
Missing air passengers
Missing person cases in Florida
People declared dead in absentia
People from Havana
People lost at sea
People of the Cuban Revolution
Victims of aviation accidents or incidents in Cuba
Victims of aviation accidents or incidents in 1959